Ponometia binocula, the prairie bird-dropping moth, is a bird dropping moth in the family Noctuidae. The species was first described by Augustus Radcliffe Grote in 1875.

The MONA or Hodges number for Ponometia binocula is 9089.

References

Further reading

External links
 

Acontiinae
Articles created by Qbugbot
Moths described in 1875